Crassispira semiinflata is a species of sea snail, a marine gastropod mollusk in the family Pseudomelatomidae.

Description
The length of the shell varies between 35 mm and 52 mm.

Distribution
This marine species occurs off  Southern California, USA and in the Baja California, Mexico

References

 Grant, U. S. & Gale, H. R. (1931). Catalogue of the marine Pliocene and Pleistocene Mollusca of California and adjacent region. Memoirs of the San Diego Society of Natural History 1: 1036 pp. + 32 pl page(s): 561, pl. 26 fig. 19

External links
 
 

semiinflata
Gastropods described in 1931